Kanupulage Ugo Singho (July 14, 1912 – April 12, 1999), popularly known as Hugo Master or Hugo Fernando, was an actor and composer of Sri Lankan cinema. Debuting in the first Sinhalese film Kadawunu Poronduwa, Fernando had an over 50 year career also as a lyricist, assistant director and music director.

Personal life
Fernando was born on 14 July 1912 in Periyamulla, Negombo as the eldest of the family. His father was Peduru Fernando, who was famous for repairing village houses. His mother Liyanage Elizabeth Fernando was a housewife. He has one younger sister, Martha Mary Fernando. He attended Dalupotha Roman Catholic School but was forced to drop out in the seventh grade to support his poverty stricken family.  His father fell from a scaffolding and unable to move since then. Therefore his mother started to work in coir mill. He took to working at coir mills, estates, tobacco stores, fish stalls and in masonry to this end.

After stopping at the coir mill, he joined a group of fishermen in Kukulawa, Trincomalee, where he joined a fishing group at the village Alambala, 24 miles from Mullaitivu. After few months, he joined to a tobacco store in Hiriyale with a friend and worked as a cook. Later, he worked as a "kankanam" in a garden in Puttalam. During this period, he used to learn English and cookery from a Tamil teacher. He changed Ugo's name into "Hugo" due to famous French writer Victor Hugo, teacher's favorite. At the age of 16, Hugo went to work as an assistant mason.

He was married to Elizabeth Fernando in 1935. The couple has six children - eldest Bridget Malini, then son Nimal Anthony, daughter Lalitha, three sons Gamini Malcus, Sarath and Brito. Brito Fernando was a member of the Negombo Municipal Council for some time and currently works for the family of the missing in The Human Rights Council.

He died on 12 April 1999 at the age of 86.

Cinema career
An encounter with Welgampola Malachias Perera, better known as "Malathias Master", led to Fernando joining the musician's orchestra as a mouth organ and mandolin player. His first play was broadcast on the 1934 radio station. He then joined the Minerva Theatre Group and wrote music for B. A. W. Jayamanne's play Awatharaya. Fernando contributed to the recording of Rukmani Devi and H. W. Rupasinghe's song Sri Buddha Gaya Vihare in 1939.

In 1947, Fernando took a triple role in the production of the first Sinhalese film Kadawunu Poronduwa, an adaption of Jayammanne's play. In addition to playing a role in the movie, he sang the song Sandyawe Shriya with Rukmani Devi and penned its songs such as Eddie Jayamanne's "Lapate Rupe Age". At the same time, Hugo joined the drama group of P. S. Kularatne's "Sirilak Limited". Hugo has been performed all over the country as the harmonium player of Shanthi Kumara Seneviratne's dance troupe. He then produced the play Gehenu Hitha, written by the Malathias Master.

Fernando worked extensively in the 1950s in such trades as assistant director on Banda Nagarayata Pemineema (1952) and Prema Tharangaya (1953), screenwriter on films like Puduma Leli (1953), Ahankara Sthree (1954), Mathalang (1955) and Duppathage Duka (1956) and music director and singer in Pitisara Kella (1953) and Saradiel (1954). He played the lead role for the first time in the film Prema Tharangaya as well as the songwriter. Additionally, he played major roles in many of these films. In 1954, five of his songs in the film Ahankara Sthree were popular.

Subsequently, Fernando has portrayed characters in such films as Sandesaya (1960), Dheewarayo (1964), Allapu Gedara (1965), Surekha, Sihasuna, Sahayata Danny (1974), Kawda Raja (1976), Chin Chin Nona (1977) and Hitha Honda Minihek (1975).

Fernando has been involved to introduce many new faces to Sinhala cinema, where they became the popular stars in the coming years. He trained Clarice de Silva as an actress and introduced Rohini Jayakody and Ravindra Rupasena to cinema with the film Ahankara Sthree. Then he introduced Anthony C. Perera through Duppathage Duka and Vijitha Mallika through Sooraya. He also introduced Thilakasiri Fernando and Jeevarani Kurukulasuriya to Lester James Peries. Popular actors, Anton Gregory, Bernard Reginald and Andrew Jayamanne entered cinema under the guidance of Hugo Fernando.

Hugo also worked as an assistant director in the film Vana Mohini.

Filmography

References

External links
Hugo Fernando's Biography in Sinhala Cinema Database

1912 births
1999 deaths
Sri Lankan male film actors
Sinhalese male actors 
20th-century Sri Lankan male actors